The Frontbench of Ben Chifley was the federal Australian Labor Party frontbench from 13 July 1945 until Chifley's death on 13 June 1951. It was opposed by the Liberal-Country Coalition led by Robert Menzies.

Ben Chifley was appointed Prime Minister of Australia upon his election as leader of the Australian Labor Party on 12 July 1945 and his frontbench formed the Australian Government until Labor's defeat at the 1949 election. Chifley subsequently served as Leader of the Opposition until his death.

First ministry (1945-1946)

Second ministry (1946-1949)

Caucus Executive (1950-1951)
The following were members of the ALP Caucus Executive from 21 February 1950 to 20 June 1951:
 Rt Hon. Ben Chifley  - Leader of the Opposition and Leader of the Labor Party
 Rt Hon. H. V. Evatt   - Deputy Leader of the Opposition and Deputy Leader of the Labor Party
 Senator Hon. Bill Ashley - Leader of the Opposition in the Senate
 Senator Hon. Nick McKenna - Deputy Leader of the Opposition in the Senate
 Kim Beazley Sr. 
 Tom Burke 
 Hon. Arthur Calwell 
 Hon. Cyril Chambers 
 Hon. Percy Clarey 
 Senator Joe Cooke
 Senator Hon. Ben Courtice
 Hon. Reg Pollard 
 Sol Rosevear 
 Hon. Eddie Ward

See also
 Frontbench of John Curtin
 Frontbench of H. V. Evatt
 Fourth Menzies Ministry
 Fifth Menzies Ministry

References

Australian Labor Party
Chifley
Opposition of Australia